The Great Buck Howard is a 2008 American comedy-drama film directed by Sean McGinly that stars Colin Hanks and John Malkovich. Tom Hanks also appears as the father of his real-life son's character. The character Buck Howard is inspired by the mentalist The Amazing Kreskin, whose popularity was at its height in the 1970s. The film premiered at the 2008 Sundance Film Festival on January 18, 2008. It is the first Walden Media film to be distributed by Magnolia Pictures.

Plot summary
Troy Gable (Colin Hanks) defies his father (Tom Hanks) and leaves law school to pursue his dream of becoming a writer in Los Angeles. To support himself, he takes a job as a road manager for "The Great" Buck Howard (John Malkovich), a fading mentalist. Troy comes to enjoy traveling with Buck to performances in smaller venues such as Bakersfield and Akron. In particular, Troy sincerely admires Buck's signature trick: having someone in the audience hide his fee for that night's performance, which he then unfailingly discovers. (Kreskin is said to have actually performed this feat 6,000 times, only failing to find the money nine times.)

A reluctant publicist, Valerie Brennan (Emily Blunt), is sent to join them in Cincinnati as a replacement for a more senior colleague to promote Buck's still secret attempt to resurrect his career. Valerie is disgusted by Buck's verbal abuse towards her and Troy, with whom she becomes romantically involved. Buck reveals that his comeback will involve putting "hundreds" of people (actually only a few dozen) to sleep and then awakening them as if from the dead. The trick works, but despite a large press turnout, no one is there to record the act, since the news media is called away at the last second to cover a car accident involving Jerry Springer. Furious, Buck unfairly blames the mishap on Troy and Valerie, and then faints from exhaustion.  In the hospital, Buck and Troy discover that the media absence actually worked in Buck's favor, as rumors reported by the news media exaggerate the scope of Buck's act; as a result, Buck returns to the limelight as a retro-"hip" phenomenon. He appears on television shows such as those of Jon Stewart, Regis Philbin, Conan O'Brien, and more. Buck is reunited with his estranged friend, George Takei, who sings "What the World Needs Now".

Buck finally gets the call he has been waiting for: To perform once again on The Tonight Show. He previously had performed with Johnny Carson 61 times during the height of his career, but never since the show has been hosted by Jay Leno. Buck is bumped by Tom Arnold, who has too much material and uses up Buck's time. Buck refuses an immediate offer to come back and appear on The Tonight Show the following week, but agrees to receive an offer to headline a date in Las Vegas. When the limelight on Buck dims once more after he fails to find his money for the first time ever during his Las Vegas premiere, Troy leaves him and through Valerie's connections, lands a job with a celebrated TV writer (Griffin Dunne). After some time, Troy sees from an ad in the paper that Buck is doing his show again in Bakersfield. Buck is clearly back where he feels most comfortable, and once again successfully performs his signature trick, leaving Troy to wonder whether Buck doesn't have some mysterious talent after all.

Cast

 John Malkovich as Buck Howard
 Colin Hanks as Troy Gable
 Emily Blunt as Valerie Brennan
 Ricky Jay as Gil Bellamy
 Steve Zahn as Kenny the limo driver
 Tom Hanks as Mr. Gable
 Griffin Dunne as Johnathan Finerman
 Matthew Gray Gubler as Russell
 Debra Monk as Doreen
 Adam Scott as Alan Berkman
 Patrick Fischler as Michael Perry
 Wallace Langham as Dan Green
 Don Most (aka "Donny Most") as Tonight Show Producer
 Nate Hartley as Teenager
 Wendy Worthington as Oregon woman
 Jack Carter as grateful old performer
 Dave Attell as Comedian

 Portraying themselves

 Gary Coleman
 Michael Winslow
 Jack Carter
 Martha Stewart
 Damien Fahey
 Conan O'Brien
 Jon Stewart
 David Blaine
 Regis Philbin
 Kelly Ripa
 George Takei
 Mary Hart
 Jay Leno
 Tom Arnold
 Bill Saluga

Reception
The Great Buck Howard received generally positive reviews. Rotten Tomatoes reported that 71% of critics gave it positive reviews based on 94 reviews, with an average score of 6.40/10. The website's critics consensus reads: "By turns fluffy and biting, this show biz comedy is given girth by comic heavyweight John Malkovich and made all the more charming by Emily Blunt." The film was released to the general public on March 20, 2009, grossing $750,000 in total. It was run in 55 theaters, equaling to an average of $2,091 per theater. The worldwide gross stands at $900,689.

References

External links
 
 
 
 
 
 The Great Buck Howard at Magnolia Pictures

2008 films
2008 comedy-drama films
2008 independent films
2000s American films
2000s English-language films
American comedy-drama films
American independent films
Films about magic and magicians
Films directed by Sean McGinly
Films produced by Gary Goetzman
Films produced by Tom Hanks
Films scored by Blake Neely
Playtone films